The Buchan Caves are a group of limestone caves that include the Royal Cave and the Fairy Cave, located south-west of , in the East Gippsland region of the Australian state of Victoria.

The Buchan Cave Reserve has been transferred back to the Gunaikurnai Nation and is jointly managed with the state.

The limestone rock at Buchan was laid down during the Devonian period about 300 – 400 million years ago. At the time, the sea covered this area of East Gippsland which was alive with shellfish and coral. Their remains were deposited in layers and over the years compacted to form limestone. The caves were formed by solution of the limestone.

Other caves nearby include Cloggs Cave and New Guinea II cave.

Tourism 

The caves are a major tourist attraction for Buchan and for East Gippsland. Daily tours are conducted in Royal Cave and Fairy Cave. Royal Cave features calcite-rimmed pools and in Fairy Cave features elaborate stalactites and stalagmites. Both caves are lit, have walkways and have a constant temperature of  making it a comfortable temperature all year round.

The Buchan Caves are situated within the Buchan Caves Reserve. There is access to short and long walks in the surrounding bushland and the nearby Snowy River National Park. The area is surrounded by trees and wildlife, including over 60 species of birds including bellbirds and lyrebirds. Amenities include campsites and cabins, picnic ground, playground and an information centre.

History

Aboriginal history
The traditional and current custodians of the Buchan Caves and its surrounds are the Australian Aboriginal Gunaikurnai Nation.

European history
Buchan Caves were first identified and described for colonial settlers, when in 1840. Stewart Ryrie, Junior, accompanied by an Aboriginal guide and three soldiers, came across caves, in the course of a survey of the area. He entered one of the caves, on 7 April 1840, possibly the one known as 'the Garage'. In January 1861, the Austrian-born artist  Johann Joseph Eugen von Guerard, visited the caves and made a pencil sketch of the interior of a cave.

The caves were accidentally made a reserve in 1887, as they were on land set aside for stock camping. The government commissioned an exploration of the land and, on the recommendation of the geologist Albert Ernest Kitson, reserved the area to protect the caves (for geological and limited recreational use).

In 1907, Frank Moon reported back about the Fairy Cave which was then opened to the public later that year. Royal Cave was mapped in 1910 by Frederick Wilson and after an entrance tunnel was excavated, it was opened to visitors in 1913. The Caves Reserve was set out and planted mostly in the late 1930s.

The site is listed on the Victorian Heritage Register and is included a Heritage Overlay.

References

External links

 
 Gippsland’s official tourism website
 The Buchan Caves Area (geology)
Media at Wikimedia Commons under Category: Buchan Caves Reserve

Tourist attractions in Victoria (Australia)
Show caves in Australia
Caves of Victoria (Australia)
Victorian Heritage Register
Shire of East Gippsland